This is a list of Manipuri feature films certified by Central Board of Film Certification (CBFC) and released in 2019.

Some of them made entries in the prestigious national and international film festivals of 2019 and 2020 and had won awards. Eigi Kona, Eikhoishibu Kanano, Nongphadok Lakpa Atithi and Pandam Amada are such films of 2019. A few films certified in 2019 were released in 2020 and 2021 and hence tagged as 2020 or 2021 films.

Only two Manipuri feature films were certified by CBFC in 2020.

January–March

April–June

July–September

October–December

List of Manipuri films of 2020
No separate page is created for the list of Manipuri films of 2020 as only two movies were certified in the year.

References

Cinema of Manipur
Lists of 2019 films by country or language
2019 in Indian cinema
Lists of Indian films
Meitei language-related lists
 2019